Can't Forget: A Souvenir of the Grand Tour is a live album by Canadian singer-songwriter Leonard Cohen, released in May 2015. It contains live recordings from concerts and sound-checks.

Track listing
All songs written by Leonard Cohen, except where noted.

Charts

Weekly charts

Year-end charts

References

Leonard Cohen live albums
2015 live albums
Columbia Records live albums